Peruneloidea is an extinct superfamily of fossil sea snails, marine gastropod mollusks in the clade Caenogastropoda.

Families
Families within the superfamily Peruneloidea are as follows:
 † Family Perunelidae
 † Family Chuchlinidae
 † Family Imoglobidae
 † Family Sphaerodomidae

References